Osieki  is a village in the administrative district of Gmina Sianów, within Koszalin County, West Pomeranian Voivodeship, in north-western Poland.

The village has a population of 444.

References

Osieki